One Night is a British 2012 drama series broadcast on BBC One, about four people linked by an event in their local area. Classical singer Errollyn Wallen provides the opening and closing theme to each episode with her song "Daedalus".

Cast list: Billy Matthews (Alfie), Jessica Hynes (Carol), Georgina Campbell (Rochelle), Douglas Hodge (Ted)

Filming locations
Filmed on location around Hackney in London. The fictional Lakemead estate is actually the De Beauvoir estate in Hackney. The scenes at Ted's home were shot in Haggerston Road, Dalston, London. The scenes at the Co-op shop where Carol works were shot in Wrythe Lane, Rosehill, London. The scenes in the street where Rochelle meets Sami were filmed in King Street, Southall. The scenes at the nightclub Alfie enters were shot in The Broadway, Mill Hill. The store where Alfie shoplifts is in Kingsland Road, Dalston. The Pub where Carol performs her stand-up act is the Sir Richard Steele in Haverstock Hill, London.

Episodes

The series was repeated on the London Live television channel in September 2014.

References

External links 

2012 British television series debuts
2012 British television series endings
2010s British drama television series
BBC television dramas
English-language television shows
Television shows set in London